This article shows the 2007 season of South Korean football.

AFC Asian Cup

National team results

Senior team

Under-23 team

K League

Regular season

Championship playoffs

Bracket

Final table

Korean FA Cup

Korean League Cup

Group stage

Group A

Group B

Knockout stage

Korea National League

First stage

Second stage

Championship playoff

A3 Champions Cup

AFC Champions League

Group stage

Group F

Group G

Knockout stage

See also
Football in South Korea

References

External links

 
Seasons in South Korean football